Edward Percival Whitley Hughes (born 1868; date of death unknown), commonly known as Percy Hughes, was a Welsh footballer who played as a defender and made three appearances for the Wales national team.

Career
Hughes made his international debut for Wales on 12 March 1887 in the 1886–87 British Home Championship against Ireland, which finished as a 1–4 loss in Belfast. His next two appearances for Wales were in 1889 during the 1888–89 British Home Championship, featuring against England on 23 February and Ireland on 27 April, the latter match for his third and final cap.

Career statistics

International

References

External links
 
 

1868 births
Date of birth missing
Year of death missing
Welsh footballers
Wales international footballers
Association football defenders
Bangor F.C. players